Chullpani (Aymara chullpa an ancient funerary building, -ni a suffix, "the one with chullpa constructions") is a mountain in the Bolivian Andes which reaches a height of approximately . It is located in the La Paz Department, Loayza Province, Luribay Municipality. Chullpani lies northeast of Ch'apini.

References 

Mountains of La Paz Department (Bolivia)